Braddock Run is a  long 2nd order tributary to Big Sandy Creek in Fayette County, Pennsylvania.

Course
Braddock Run rises about 0.25 miles east of Chalk Hill, Pennsylvania, and then flows southwest to join Big Sandy Creek about 2 miles south of Chalk Hill.

Watershed
Braddock Run drains  of area, receives about 52.4 in/year of precipitation, has a wetness index of 345.34, and is about 72% forested.

See also
List of rivers of Pennsylvania

References

Rivers of Pennsylvania
Rivers of Fayette County, Pennsylvania